David Willis may refer to:

 David Willis (English footballer) (1881–1949), English footballer for Sunderland, Newcastle United, and Reading
 David Willis (cartoonist) (born 1979), web cartoonist
 David Willis (journalist) (born 1960), BBC correspondent
 David Willis (Australian footballer) (born 1968), Australian rules footballer
 Dave Willis (born 1970), American voice actor, writer, and producer
 Dave Willis (comedian) (1895–1973), Scottish comedian and actor
 Ski (record producer) (born David Willis), American record producer
 David Willis (artist) (born 1932), Irish artist
 David Willis (linguist), linguist and Celticist
 David Willis (politician), member of the North Carolina House of Representatives

See also
 David Wills (disambiguation)